Ursula Kamizuru née Hirschmüller (7 November 1953 - 5 August 2008) was a German table tennis player.

She was five time German champion in her country's national table tennis championships. She participated in four world championships and five European championships in the 1970s. She started playing table tennis aged eleven. She married Hideyuki Kamizuru in 1999.

References

1953 births
2008 deaths
People from Wesel
Sportspeople from Düsseldorf (region)
German female table tennis players